The Personal Ordinariate of Our Lady of Walsingham in England and Wales is a personal ordinariate in the Latin Church of the Catholic Church immediately exempt, being directly subject to the Holy See. It is within the territory of the Catholic Bishops' Conference of England and Wales, of which its ordinary is a member, and also encompasses Scotland. It was established on 15 January 2011 for groups of former Anglicans in England and Wales in accordance with the apostolic constitution Anglicanorum coetibus of Pope Benedict XVI.

The personal ordinariate is set up in such a way that "corporate reunion" of former Anglicans with the Catholic Church is possible while also preserving elements of a "distinctive Anglican patrimony". The ordinariate was placed under the title of Our Lady of Walsingham and under the patronage of John Henry Newman, a former Anglican himself.

History

Background

The apostolic constitution which allows for the institution of personal ordinariates for Anglicans who join the Roman Catholic Church was released on 9 November 2009, after being announced on 20 October 2009 by Cardinal William Levada at a press conference in Rome.

Anglican responses

The Bishop of Lincoln, John Saxbee, said that "I can't judge the motives behind it [the offer], but the way it was done doesn't sit easily with all of the talk about working towards better relations" and that "Fence mending will need to be done to set conversations back on track."

Roman Catholic clergy who were present at an ecumenical service at Westminster Cathedral for the Week of Prayer for Christian Unity were reported as being "dismayed" by the sermon by Canon Giles Fraser, then chancellor of St Paul's Cathedral, which included comments that the ordinariate had a "slightly predatory feel" and that "In corporate terms, [it is] a little like a takeover bid in some broader power play of church politics."

In 2011, Bishop Christopher Hill, the chairman of the Church of England's Council for Christian Unity, described the erection of the ordinariate as an "insensitive act".

In 2019, the Archbishop of Canterbury, Justin Welby, responded to Anglican priests defecting to Rome in this way by saying "Who cares?" and that he did not mind people leaving to join other denominations as long as they are "faithful disciples of Christ".

Formation
In October 2010, the parochial church council of St Peter's Church in Folkestone became the first Church of England parochial group to formally begin the process of joining the Roman Catholic Church.

On 8 November 2010, three serving and two retired bishops of the Church of England announced their intention to join the Roman Catholic Church. The serving bishops were provincial episcopal visitors Bishop Andrew Burnham of Ebbsfleet, Bishop Keith Newton of Richborough and Bishop John Broadhurst of Fulham. The retired bishops were Edwin Barnes, formerly Bishop of Richborough, and David Silk, formerly Bishop of Ballarat in Australia and an honorary assistant bishop in the diocese of Exeter. The then Archbishop of Canterbury, Rowan Williams, announced that he had with regret accepted the resignations of Bishops Burnham and Newton. In the following week, the Catholic Bishops' Conference of England and Wales considered the proposed ordinariate and gave assurances of a warm welcome for those who wish to be part of it.

On 1 January 2011, Broadhurst, Burnham and Newton (together with their wives, apart from Burnham whose wife is Jewish), three former Anglican nuns of a convent at Walsingham and former members of 20 different Anglican parishes, were received into the Roman Catholic Church.

The first personal ordinariate, the Personal Ordinariate of Our Lady of Walsingham, within the territory of the Catholic Bishops' Conference of England and Wales, was established on 15 January 2011 with Keith Newton appointed as the first ordinary.

About half of St Peter's Parish, Folkestone (mentioned above), including their priest, were received into the ordinariate on 9 March 2011, along with 600 other Anglicans largely from south-east England, with six groups from the Southwark diocese.

The "ordinariate groups", numbering approximately 900 members, entered the ordinariate at Easter 2011, thereby becoming Roman Catholics. Initially, 61 Anglican priests were expected to be received, but some subsequently withdrew, remaining in the Church of England. John Hunwicke, who joined the ordinariate, had his reordination "deferred" owing to unspecified comments allegedly made by him on his Internet blog site, but was subsequently ordained  to the Catholic presbyterate. In 2012, Robert Mercer, a former bishop in both the Anglican Communion and the Traditional Anglican Communion, was received into the ordinariate and ordained on 27 March 2012 by Bishop Alan Hopes at the Cathedral of St John the Evangelist, Portsmouth.

In 2013, the Personal Ordinariate of Our Lady of Walsingham became the first ordinariate to have a married layman on his way to priesthood.

In 2014, Monsignor Keith Newton, the ordinary, admitted that the ordinariate had not grown as much as was hoped. It had not yet aroused broad interest among Anglican clergy, who had not welcomed it. To revive interest among Anglican upholders of traditional Christian doctrine, the ordinariate's members, he suggested, should "communicate our message more fully and with more vigour and enthusiasm".

In 2017, Simon Beveridge and another former Anglican military chaplain (Royal Navy/Commando Royal Marines and the Army) were ordained into the priesthood in Scotland under the Personal Ordinariate of Our Lady of Walsingham. In 2018, eight men were ordained to the priesthood under the Walsingham ordinariate.

Religious
In 2010, three nuns from the Society of Saint Margaret joined the personal ordinariate. The two former SSM sisters formed the Marian Servants of the Incarnation (MSI) and hold private vows. On 12 December 2012, it was announced that 11 religious sisters from the Community of St Mary the Virgin (CSMV) intended to join the ordinariate.

On 1 January 2013, eleven sisters of the CSMV were received into the Roman Catholic Church at the Oxford Oratory of St Aloysius Gonzaga and, with a former SSM sister from Walsingham who had been one of the first members of the ordinariate, were erected as the Sisters of the Blessed Virgin Mary (SBVM), a new religious institute within the ordinariate following the Rule of St Benedict.

Financial difficulties
The ordinariate experienced what was described as "a tough first year". Writing in the Roman Catholic magazine The Tablet, Keith Newton said that the group was struggling financially. He expressed disappointment "that so many who said that they were heading in the same direction did not follow" and failed to join the ordinariate as expected. In April 2012, Pope Benedict XVI donated $250,000 to the ordinariate to help support its clergy and work.

Church buildings
Catholic church buildings throughout England, Scotland and Wales are used by the ordinariate alongside the established congregations. The Church of Our Lady of the Assumption and St Gregory in Warwick Street, Soho, London, which belongs to the Roman Catholic Archdiocese of Westminster, was designated for the ordinariate's exclusive use from Lent in 2013. Also in 2013, the Church of the Most Precious Blood in Borough, London was placed in the care of the ordinariate by the Archbishop of Southwark. It was previously a Salvatorian parish. In 2017, the ordinariate established its first ever parish in Torbay, Our Lady of Walsingham and St Cuthbert Mayne Church. The church is a former Methodist chapel. St Agatha's Church in Landport, Portsmouth, was part of the Traditional Anglican Communion before being used by the ordinariate.

The use of Church of England buildings by the ordinariate requires permission from the relevant Anglican bishop; permission has been denied in at least one case.

Ordinary
Monsignor Keith Newton, the former Anglican Bishop of Richborough, was ordained to the Roman Catholic priesthood and on 15 January 2011 was appointed the first ordinary. As he is married, he is not permitted to receive episcopal consecration in the Roman Catholic Church. On 17 March 2011, he was appointed by Pope Benedict XVI to the rank of protonotary apostolic (the highest rank of monsignor).

Liturgical calendar
The proper liturgical calendar of the ordinariate was approved by the Congregation for Divine Worship and the Discipline of the Sacraments on 15 February 2012. In the main, it is identical with the current Roman Rite liturgical calendar of the dioceses of England and Wales, but it has retained some elements that form part of the Anglican patrimony.

In the Proper of Time:
 Ember Days are observed on the Wednesday, Friday and Saturday after the First Sunday of Lent, Pentecost (Whit-Sunday), Holy Cross Day and the First Sunday of Advent.
 Rogation Days are observed on the three days following the Sixth Sunday of Easter.
 In the week between Pentecost and Trinity Sunday, elements of the former octave are fostered: while the readings of the Ordinary Time weekday are retained, the Mass propers and use of red as the liturgical colour "may sustain the themes of Pentecost".
Also:
 12 January – Saint Benedict Biscop, abbot – optional memorial (EW)
 12 January: Saint Aelred of Rievaulx – Optional Memorial (eW)
 13 January – Saint Kentigern (Mungo), bishop – optional memorial (EW)
 1 February – Saint Brigid of Kildare, abbess – optional memorial (EW)
 4 February – Saint Gilbert of Sempringham, religious – optional memorial (EW)
 5 March – Saint Piran, abbot – optional memorial (EW)
 17 March: Saint Patrick, bishop – Feast (eW)
 16 April – Saint Magnus of Orkney, martyr – optional memorial (EW)
 19 April – Saint Alphege, bishop and martyr – optional memorial (EW)
 23 April – Saint George, martyr – Solemnity (eW)
 24 April – Saint Mellitus, bishop – optional memorial (EW)
 24 April – Saint Adalbert, bishop and martyr - optional Memorial (eW)
 4 May – The English Martyrs – Feast (eW)
 6 May – Saint John the Apostle in Eastertide – optional memorial (EW)
 21 May – Saint Helena or Saint Godric of Finchale, religious – optional memorial (EW)
 23 May – Saint Petroc, abbot – optional memorial (EW)
 24 May – Saint Aldhelm, bishop – optional memorial (EW)
 25 May – Saint Bede the Venerable, priest and doctor – Memorial (eW)
 27 May – Saint Augustine of Canterbury, bishop – Feast (eW)
 28 May – Saint Gregory VII, pope or Saint Mary Magdalene de Pazzi, virgin – Optional Memorial (EW)
 9 June – Saint Columba, abbot – Optional Memorial (eW)
 16 June – Saint Richard of Chichester, bishop – Optional Memorial (eW)
 22 June – Saints John Fisher, bishop and Thomas More, martyrs – Feast (eW)
 15 July – Saint Bonaventure, bishop and Doctor of the Church; or Saint Swithun, bishop - optional memorials (EW)
 16 July – Saint Osmund, bishop – optional memorials (EW)
 20 July – Saint Margaret of Antioch, martyr – optional memorial (EW)
 5 August – Saint Oswald, martyr – optional memorial (EW)
 26 August – Blessed Dominic of the Mother of God Barberi, priest – Optional Memorial (eW)
 30 August – Saints Margaret Clitherow, Anne Line and Margaret Ward, martyrs – Optional Memorial (eW)
 31 August – Saint Aidan, bishop and the Saints of Lindisfarne – Optional Memorial (eW)
 3 September – Saint Gregory the Great, pope and doctor – Feast (eW)
 4 September – Saint Cuthbert, bishop – Optional Memorial (eW)
 17 September – Saint Ninian, bishop or Saint Edith of Wilton, religious – optional memorials (EW)
 19 September – Saint Theodore of Canterbury, bishop – Optional Memorial (eW)
 24 September – Our Lady of Walsingham – solemnity (EW)
 3 October – Saint Thomas of Hereford, bishop – optional memorial (EW)
 8 October – Saint Denis and companions, martyrs or Saint John Leonardi, priest – Optional Memorial (9 October in the General Calendar) (EW)
 9 October – Saint John Henry Newman, priest, patron of the ordinariate – feast (EW)
 10 October – Saint Paulinus of York, bishop – Optional Memorial (eW)
 11 October – Saint Ethelburga, abbess – optional memorial (EW)
 12 October – Saint Wilfrid, bishop – Optional Memorial (eW)
 13 October – Saint Edward the Confessor – Optional Memorial (eW)
 19 October – Saint Frideswide, abbess – optional memorial (EW)
 26 October – Saints Chad and Cedd, bishop – Optional Memorial (eW)
 7 November – Saint Willibrord, bishop – Optional Memorial (eW)
 8 November – All Saints of England – feast (E)
 8 November – All Saints of Wales – feast (w)
 16 November – Saint Edmund of Abingdon, bishop – Optional Memorial (eW)
 17 November – Saint Hilda, abbess or Saint Hugh of Lincoln, bishop or Saint Elizabeth of Hungary – Optional Memorial (eW)
 20 November – Saint Edmund, martyr – optional memorial (EW)
 1 December – Saint Edmund Campion, priest and martyr – memorial (EW)

Friends of the Ordinariate
Soon after the Personal Ordinariate of Our Lady of Walsingham was established in 2011, a group of lay Catholics founded a separate charity, called the Friends of the Ordinariate of Our Lady of Walsingham, to assist the work and mission of the ordinariate by providing both practical and financial support. The Friends of the Ordinariate, as it is commonly called, was also established in order to raise awareness of the ordinariate's life and mission within the wider Catholic community. The ordinary, Mgr Keith Newton, is the organisation's president. The current chairman is Nicolas Ollivant. Honorary vice presidents include Lord Deben; Matthew Festing (Prince and Grand Master of the Sovereign Military Order of Malta); Charles Moore; The Duke of Norfolk; The Countess of Oxford and Asquith; Katharine, Duchess of Kent and Lord Nicholas Windsor.

See also
Anglican-Roman Catholic dialogue
Anglo-Catholicism
Catholic Church hierarchy#Equivalents of diocesan bishops in law
Continuing Anglican movement
Ecumenism
List of Anglican bishops who converted to Roman Catholicism
Pontifical Council for Promoting Christian Unity
Simon Beveridge

References

External links

 Personal Ordinariate of Our Lady of Walsingham website
 Text of the Anglicanorum coetibus apostolic constitution

 Documents about Personal Ordinariates

Our Lady of Walsingham
Pope Benedict XVI
Catholic Church in England and Wales
Roman Catholic dioceses and prelatures established in the 21st century
Christian organizations established in 2011
Roman Catholic dioceses in England and Wales
Religious organisations based in England